Haywood County Courthouse is a historic courthouse building located at Waynesville, Haywood County, North Carolina. It was built in 1932, and is a three-story, ashlar stone veneered rectangular building in the Classical Revival style. It features a slightly projecting entrance pavilion with a pedimented frontispiece resting on four engaged Doric order columns.

It was listed on the National Register of Historic Places in 1979.  It is located in the Waynesville Main Street Historic District.

References

County courthouses in North Carolina
Courthouses on the National Register of Historic Places in North Carolina
Neoclassical architecture in North Carolina
Government buildings completed in 1932
Buildings and structures in Haywood County, North Carolina
National Register of Historic Places in Haywood County, North Carolina
Historic district contributing properties in North Carolina
Waynesville, North Carolina